Johan Yoga Utama (born February 19, 1990 in Semarang) is an Indonesian professional footballer who plays as a striker for Liga 2 club PSIM Yogyakarta.

Club statistics

Club

Honours

Individual
 Indonesia Soccer Championship B Top Goalscorer: 2016 (14 goals)

References

External links
 Johan Yoga Utama at Soccerway
 Johan Yoga Utama at Liga Indonesia

1990 births
Association football forwards
Badak Lampung F.C. players
Javanese people
Indonesian footballers
Liga 1 (Indonesia) players
Persib Bandung players
Persiba Balikpapan players
Persisam Putra Samarinda players
PSIS Semarang players
Persiraja Banda Aceh players
Living people
People from Semarang
Sportspeople from Central Java